Steven Lewerenz (born 18 May 1991) is a German professional footballer who most recently played as a left winger for SG Sonnenhof Großaspach.

Career
In December 2018, after featuring sparingly in the first half of the 2018–19 season, Lewerenz agreed the termination of his contract with Holstein Kiel.

Days later, he joined league rivals 1. FC Magdeburg.

Ahead of the 2019–20 season, Lewerenz joined R.E. Virton in Belgium. In half a season with the club he made one 15-minute substitute appearance. In October 2019, he was relegated to the club's B-team.

In January 2020, he returned to Germany signing with FC Viktoria Köln. Lewerenz then moved to Rot-Weiss Essen on 1 February 2021, signing a deal for the rest of the season.

In March 2022 he agreed the termination of his contract with SG Sonnenhof Großaspach.

References

External links
 

1991 births
Living people
Footballers from Hamburg
German footballers
Association football forwards
Germany youth international footballers
Austrian Football Bundesliga players
2. Bundesliga players
3. Liga players
Regionalliga players
Hamburger SV II players
Kapfenberger SV players
RB Leipzig players
Würzburger Kickers players
SV Eintracht Trier 05 players
1. FSV Mainz 05 II players
Holstein Kiel players
1. FC Magdeburg players
R.E. Virton players
FC Viktoria Köln players
Rot-Weiss Essen players
SG Sonnenhof Großaspach players
German expatriate footballers
German expatriate sportspeople in Austria
Expatriate footballers in Austria
German expatriate sportspeople in Belgium
Expatriate footballers in Belgium